"Walk the Way the Wind Blows" is a song written by Tim O'Brien, and recorded by American country music artist Kathy Mattea.  It released in September 1986 as the second single and title track from the album Walk the Way the Wind Blows.  The song reached #10 on the Billboard Hot Country Singles & Tracks chart.

Chart performance

References

Songs about weather
1986 singles
1986 songs
Kathy Mattea songs
Song recordings produced by Allen Reynolds
Mercury Records singles